George Mulholland may refer to:

George Mulholland (footballer) (1928–2002), Scottish footballer
George Mulholland (boxer) (1904–1971), American boxer